Yangmingshan Administrative Bureau was a county level administrative body in Republic of China's Taiwan Province between 1949 and 1973.

History 
The territory of the Yangmingshan Administrative Bureau was administered by Shirin Town and Hokutō Town under Shichisei District of Taihoku Prefecture. It is famous for the hot springs (Onsen) from the Tatun Volcano Group. After the Chinese Civil War, the Kuomintang led Government of the Republic of China relocated to Taiwan. The President Chiang Kai-shek settled his residence in this region. This region was then made a special zone to protect the leadership of the country.
 26 August 1949, Tsaoshan Administrative Bureau was established by Taiwan Provincial Government. Its territory covers Shihlin Township and Peitou Township under Taipei County.
 31 March 1950, Tsaoshan was renamed Yangmingshan. The bureau was also renamed accordingly.
 1 July 1968, the bureau transferred from Taiwan Province to the newly established special municipality — Taipei City. It still remained as a county level division, the two townships were reformed as Districts.
 1 January 1974, Taipei City Government took over the administrative power of the bureau. Shilin District and Beitou District are directly led by the city government. The bureau remained as the first level department under the Taipei City Government, but it only administered environmental maintenance and tourism only.
 1 January 1977, The bureau was downgraded to Yangmingshan Administrative Office, a second level office under the Department of Civil Affairs, Taipei City Government. 
 1 January 1980, Yangmingshan Administrative Office was downgraded to Yangmingshan Park Administrative Establishment, a third level office under the Parks and Street Lights Office, Public Works Department, Taipei City Government.

Administration 
Magistrate of the Yangmingshan Administrative Bureau was appointed by the defunct Taiwan Provincial Government. The former Taipei County Council, whose power was transferred to the Provisional Taipei City Council after 1968, oversaw the Bureau, while its budget was allocated by the provincial government.

Hierarchy

Landmarks 
 Grass Mountain Chateau — Residence of Chiang Kai-shek, former President of the Republic of China, from December 1949 to 1950, then used as summer residence
 Shilin Official Residence — Residence of Chiang Kai-shek from 1950 to 1975
 Zhongxing Guesthouse — Guesthouse of Chiang Kai-shek
 Chung-Shan Building — Meeting place of the defunct National Assembly

See also 
 Shilin District
 Beitou District
 Yangmingshan
 Bo'ai Special Zone
 Taipei

1949 establishments in Taiwan
Government of Taipei